Topsy is an unincorporated community in Mercer County, in the U.S. state of Missouri.

History
Topsy had its start in 1885. A post office called Topsy was established in 1885, and remained in operation until 1906.

References

Unincorporated communities in Mercer County, Missouri
Unincorporated communities in Missouri